is a Japanese rugby union footballer. He plays for the Kobe Kobelco Steelers in Japan's Top League, and the Japanese rugby team. He has earned 18 caps for his country.

Hirashima was born in Kumamoto, Southern Japan and graduated from Kumamoto Nishi High School and Fukuoka University. He is currently the captain for the Kobe Steelers, and has made 62 first team appearances as a prop.

External links
 
 Profile on Kobe website 

1983 births
Japanese rugby union players
Living people
Japan international rugby union players
Kobelco Kobe Steelers players
People from Kumamoto
Rugby union props